Father William B. Wasson (December 21, 1923 - August 16, 2006) was an American Catholic priest.  He was born in Phoenix, Arizona, United States, but moved to Mexico where he trained as a priest.  In 1954, he founded Nuestros Pequeños Hermanos, a charity for orphans and neglected and abandoned children, which today operates across Latin America. Wasson died in August 2006 in Arizona, due to complications arising from a hip injury.

Published works
Luke XV
The Sermon on the Mount
Gospel in the Dust

Achievements and awards
 Golden Plate Award of the American Academy of Achievement - 1962
 Luis Elizondo Humanitarian Award - 1977
This is the Mexican National Prize and was given for his contribution to the children of Mexico. He is the only US citizen to receive this award.
 Good Samaritan Award from the National Catholic Development Conference - 1979
 Franciscan International Award - 1981
 Order of the Aztec Eagle - 1990
This is Mexico's highest award, and recognizes services performed for Mexico or humanity by foreign nationals. This was the first time a priest had been honored.
 National Caring Award by the Caring Institute of Washington DC - 1997
 KFC's Colonel's Way Award - 1998
 El Sol de Nuestra Communidad Award - 1998
This was presented by the Hispanic Community of Phoenix, Arizona.
 Kellogg’s Hannah Neil World of Children Award - 2000
This is a $100,000 prize given to individuals who make a difference in the world of children.
 Jefferson Award for Public Service - 2003
This is recognized as the “Nobel Prize” for public service in America.  Fr. Wasson was recognized for his volunteer service to the Hispanic community.
 Ivy Humanitarian Award by the Ivy Inter-American Foundation - 2005
This was for working to improve the lives of children and their communities in the Americas
 Opus Prize Finalist - 2005
Wasson was awarded $100,000 for his "driving entrepreneurial mindset with an abiding faith to combat poverty, illiteracy, hunger, disease and injustice".

External links and references
 Washington Post Obituary
 Opus Prize
 Nuestros Pequeños Hermanos Homepage
 Report of World of Children award

Specific

1923 births
2006 deaths
20th-century American Roman Catholic priests
American expatriates in Mexico